Eloisa Reverie Vezzosi is an Italian artist and author of the art book librosogni (dreamsbook).

Film 
 Sono Angelica, voglio vendetta as Maria Romei

References 

Artist authors
Italian women artists
Italian women writers
Living people
Place of birth missing (living people)
Year of birth missing (living people)